A list of films produced in Brazil in 1970:

See also
1970 in Brazil
1970 in Brazilian television

External links
Brazilian films of 1970 at the Internet Movie Database

Brazil
1970
Films